Lonchocarpus santarosanus, the chapelno blanco, is a species of plant in the family Fabaceae. It is found in El Salvador and Guatemala. It is threatened by habitat loss.

References

santarosanus
Flora of El Salvador
Flora of Guatemala
Vulnerable plants
Taxonomy articles created by Polbot